The 1960 United States Senate elections coincided with the election of John F. Kennedy as president on November 8, 1960. The 33 seats of Class 2 were contested in regular elections. A special election was also held on June 28, 1960, for a mid-term vacancy in North Dakota. The Republicans gained two seats at the expense of the Democrats. However, Republican Senator-elect Edwin Keith Thomson of Wyoming died December 9, 1960, and was replaced by appointee Democratic John J. Hickey at the beginning of the Congress, reducing Republican gains to one seat.

The Democrats nonetheless retained a commanding lead in the Senate with 65 seats to 35. As Majority Leader Lyndon Johnson was elected Vice President, Mike Mansfield became the new Majority Leader.

Results summary 

Source:

Gains, losses, and holds

Retirements
Two Republicans and four Democrats retired instead of seeking re-election.

Defeats
One Democrat sought re-election but lost in the general election.

Post-election changes
One Republican senator-elect died on December 9, 1960, and was replaced by a Democrat. Another Democratic senator-elect resigned and was replaced by a Democrat.

Change in composition

After the June special election

Before the November elections

Result of the November elections

Beginning of the next Congress

Race summaries

Special elections during the 86th Congress 
In these special elections, the winner was seated during 1960 or before January 3, 1961; ordered by election date.

Elections leading to the next Congress 
In these general elections, the winners were elected for the term beginning January 3, 1961; ordered by state.

All of the elections involved the Class 2 seats.

Closest races 
Eleven races had a margin of victory under 10%:

Rhode Island was the tipping point state with a margin of 37.8%.

Alabama 

Incumbent John J. Sparkman won re-election, having served since 1946. He faced nominal opposition from Republican Julian E. Elgin in the then-deeply Democratic state of Alabama. Sparkman served from 1946 to 1979 in the Senate before retiring and being succeeded by Howell Heflin.

Alaska 

Incumbent Democrat Bob Bartlett was easily re-elected to his second (his first full) term in the U.S. Senate over Republican dentist Lee McKinley after originally being elected in 1958 upon Alaska's anticipated admission as a state into the United States. Bartlett had previously served as the last delegate from Alaska to Congress.

Arkansas 
Incumbent senator John L. McClellan was re-elected to a fourth term with nominal opposition from write-in independent candidate Marvin Fuchs, who received just 449 of 377,485 votes.

Colorado 

Incumbent Gordon Allott was re-elected to a second term in office, defeating lieutenant governor Robert Knous by just under eight percentage points. He would wind up winning re-election in 1966 before retiring in 1973, replaced by Democrat Floyd Haskell.

Delaware 

J. Allen Frear ran for re-election to a third term, but he was defeated by Republican governor J. Caleb Boggs by a narrow 1% margin. Boggs would be re-elected in 1966, but he would lose re-election to a third term in 1972 to future U.S. President Joe Biden.

Georgia 
Incumbent Richard B. Russell Jr. was re-elected to a sixth term in office, running unopposed in the tantamount Democratic primary and facing nominal opposition in the deeply-Democratic Georgia.

Idaho 

Henry Dworshak ran for re-election to a third term, defeating R.F. McLaughlin by just under five percentage points.

Illinois 

Incumbent Paul H. Douglas successfully ran for re-election to a third term, defeating Republican Samuel Witwer.

Iowa 
Incumbent Republican Thomas Martin decided to retire, leaving this seat open. Republican Jack Miller won the open seat, defeating Democrat Herschel C. Loveless and riding the coattails of Richard Nixon's victory in the state.

Kansas 

Incumbent Andrew Schoeppel ran for re-election to a third term, defeating Frank Theis. He would die before his term expired, and he was replaced by James B. Pearson.

Kentucky 
Incumbent John Sherman Cooper ran for re-election, defeating Keen Johnson by nearly 20%. This was the first time Cooper had won an election to a full Senate term, though he had previously served two partial terms.

Louisiana 

Incumbent Democrat Allen J. Ellender ran for re-election, having served since his election in 1936. In the deeply Democratic state of Louisiana, he was easily re-elected to another term.

Maine 

Incumbent Republican Margaret Chase Smith, the first woman to serve in both houses of Congress, was overwhelmingly re-elected to a third term, defeating Lucia Cormier. This was the first election in which a woman was nominated by both major parties for the office of U.S. Senate, meaning a woman was going to be elected regardless of who won.

Massachusetts 

Republican incumbent Leverett Saltonstall was re-elected to another term after being elected in 1944 in a special election. He defeated Democrat Thomas O'Connor Jr.

Michigan 
Democrat Patrick V. McNamara was narrowly re-elected against Republican Alvin Bentley, having served one full term prior.

Minnesota 

Democrat Hubert Humphrey, who would later become vice president, was re-elected over Republican challenger P. Kenneth Peterson. He had served since 1949.

Mississippi 

Incumbent James Eastland, who had represented Mississippi in the Senate since 1943, was elected to another term in a landslide with 92% of the vote.

Missouri (special) 

Following the death of incumbent Thomas C. Hennings, Democrat Edward V. Long, incumbent Lieutenant Governor of Missouri, ran against Republican Lon Hocker for the open seat. Long defeated Hocker by just under seven percentage points.

Montana 

After the retirement of incumbent Democrat James E. Murray, Democrat and representative Lee Metcalf and Republican Orvin Fjare ran for the open seat. Metcalf kept the seat Democratic, winning by just over 1%. This was despite Richard Nixon winning Montana in the concurrent presidential election.

Nebraska 
Republican Carl Curtis, who had served since 1955, was re-elected to a second term over Democrat Robert Conrad by nearly 17 percentage points. Curtis won all but four counties in the state.

New Hampshire 

Incumbent Republican Styles Bridges was re-elected to the Senate for a fifth term, defeating Democratic challenger Herbert W. Hill. 

Bridges died less than a year into his fifth term. With New Hampshire's other Senator Norris Cotton up for re-election in 1962 and following Bridges death. Both of New Hampshire's Senate seats would be up in the 1962 midterms.

New Jersey 

Incumbent Republican Clifford P. Case won re-election against Democrat Thorn Lord. Case would win re-election only one more time in 1966, losing in the 1972 Republican primary.

New Mexico 

Incumbent Democrat Clinton Anderson was re-elected to a third term in a landslide, defeating Republican William Colwes.

North Carolina 

Incumbent Democrat B. Everett Jordan was re-elected to his first full term after winning a special election in 1958. He defeated Republican Kyle Hayes by a slightly slimmer margin than he defeated his Republican challenger in 1958.

North Dakota (special) 

A special election was held June 28, 1960, to fill the seat vacated by William Langer, who died November 8, 1959. Clarence Norman Brunsdale, a former Governor of North Dakota, was temporarily appointed to the seat on November 19 of that year until the special election was held. North Dakota Democratic-NPL Party candidate Quentin N. Burdick faced Republican John E. Davis for election to the seat. Davis had been serving as Governor of the state since 1957.

Oklahoma 
Incumbent Democrat Robert Kerr won re-election to a third term, though he would die before the term was up and would be replaced by J. Democrat Howard Edmondson.

Oregon 

First-term Democrat Richard L. Neuberger had been diagnosed with testicular cancer in 1958 that became terminal by 1960 — but was kept from the public. Neuberger remained at home in early 1960, reportedly battling the flu. Though still publicly seeking re-election, he told his campaign chair, attorney Jack Beatty, "Remember, there's always another Neuberger," referring to his wife. The comment, combined with Neuberger's reluctance to meet in public and weak voice on the phone, led Beatty to believe that Neuberger's condition was grave, a suspicion confirmed by the Senator's physician shortly before Neuberger died at Good Samaritan Hospital on March 9, 1960.

Democratic Oregon Supreme Court judge Hall S. Lusk was appointed March 16, 1960, to continue the term, pending a special election in which he was not a candidate.

Primaries were held May 20, 1960, in which Neuberger's widow, Democrat Maurine B. Neuberger and the Republican former-Governor of Oregon Elmo Smith easily won nomination.

Maurine Brown Neuberger was elected November 8, 1960, both to finish the term and to the next term.

Oregon (special)

Oregon (regular) 

Maurine Brown Neuberger retired at the end of the term.

Rhode Island

South Carolina

South Dakota

Tennessee

Texas 

Incumbent two-term Democrat Lyndon Johnson was easily re-elected, but he was also elected the same day as Vice President with John F. Kennedy being elected president. This was the last election in which a Democrat was selected to Texas's class 2 Senate seat.

Johnson resigned January 3, 1961 — before the new Congress began — and former Democratic senator William A. Blakley was appointed to begin the term, pending a special election.  Republican John Tower, who lost to Johnson here in 1960, would win that May 1961 special election.

Virginia 

Incumbent Democrat Absalom Willis Robertson was overwhelmingly re-elected with 81% of the vote, facing no Republican opposition.

West Virginia 
Incumbent Jennings Randolph won re-election against Cecil Underwood, the incumbent governor of West Virginia.

Wyoming 

Senator-Elect Thomson died a month after his election.

See also
 1960 United States elections
 1960 United States presidential election
 1960 United States House of Representatives elections
 86th United States Congress
 87th United States Congress

Notes

References

Bibliography